Broken-Boosey State Park is a linear corridor along sections of Nine Mile Creek, Boosey Creek, and Broken Creek, between Shepparton and Tocumwal, in Victoria's north. It protects some of the few remaining stands of native vegetation in this part of Victoria, including threatened species such as coolibah grass, spiny-fruit saltbush and pepper grass.

References

State parks of Victoria (Australia)
Protected areas established in 2002
2002 establishments in Australia
Parks of Hume (region)